US bombing of Cambodia may refer to:

 Operation Menu (1969-1970)
 Operation Freedom Deal (1970-1973)